Steve McLean is a retired Scottish-American soccer forward who played professionally in the Major Indoor Soccer League and was a member of the U.S. team at the 1981 FIFA World Youth Championship.  He is currently a sales manager with Nike, Inc.

Soccer

Youth
Raised in Kearny, McLean graduated from Kearny High School where he was a 1978 First Team High School All American soccer player. He was later selected to the Wall Soccer Club team of the 1970s.  He attended Philadelphia Textile, playing on the men's soccer team from 1979 to 1983.  He was a 1980 Honorable Mention as well as a 1982 and 1983 first team All American.  He is currently sixth on the team's all-time assists list and eighth on the all time goals list.

National team
In 1981, McLean was a member of the United States U-20 men's national soccer team at the 1981 FIFA World Youth Championship.

Professional
In 1984, McLean played for the Charlotte Gold of the United Soccer League.  On 27 September 1984, he signed with the Wichita Wings of the Major Indoor Soccer League.  Several injuries and illnesses limited him to one game his rookie season as he was moved to defense.  In 1986, he moved to the New York Express which collapsed during the season.

Sports apparel industry
In 1989, McLean retired from professional soccer and entered the sports apparel field with Umbro USA.  In 1997, he moved to Adidas as the Director of Product Marketing before moving to the Oswego Group in 2000 and back to Umbro in 2003.

References

External links
 MISL stats
 FIFA player profile

1961 births
Living people
All-American men's college soccer players
American soccer players
Charlotte Gold players
Kearny High School (New Jersey) alumni
Major Indoor Soccer League (1978–1992) players
New York Express players
Parade High School All-Americans (boys' soccer)
People from Kearny, New Jersey
Scottish emigrants to the United States
Footballers from Glasgow
Sportspeople from Hudson County, New Jersey
United Soccer League (1984–85) players
Wichita Wings (MISL) players
Association football forwards